Gary Weber (24 April 1952 – 7 April 2012) was a South African cricketer. He played in one first-class and one List A match for Border in 1975/76.

See also
 List of Border representative cricketers

References

External links
 

1952 births
2012 deaths
South African cricketers
Border cricketers
Cricketers from East London, Eastern Cape